The China–Tajikistan border is  in length and runs from the tripoint with Kyrgyzstan following a roughly north–south line across various mountain ridges and peaks of the Pamir range down to the tripoint with Afghanistan. The border divides Murghob District, Gorno-Badakhshan Autonomous Region in Tajikistan from Akto County, Kizilsu Kyrgyz Autonomous Prefecture (to the north) and Taxkorgan Tajik Autonomous County, Kashgar Prefecture (to the south) in Xinjiang Uygur Autonomous Region, China.

History

The origins of the border date from the mid-19th century, when the Russian empire expanded into Central Asia and established control over the Lake Zaysan region. The establishment of the border between the Russian Empire and the Qing Empire, not too different from today's Sino-Kazakh/Kyrgyz/Tajik border was provided for in the Convention of Peking of 1860; the actual border line pursuant to the convention was drawn by the Treaty of Tarbagatai (1864) and the Treaty of Uliassuhai (1870), leaving Lake Zaysan on the Russian side. The Qing Empire's military presence in the Irtysh basin crumbled during the Dungan revolt (1862–1877). After the failure of the rebellion and the reconquest of Xinjiang by Zuo Zongtang, the border between the Russian and the Qing empires in the Ili River basin was further slightly readjusted, in Russia's favour, by the Treaty of Saint Petersburg (1881) and a series of later protocols. In 1915 an agreement was signed more precisely delimiting the border between the Ili Valley and the Dzungarian Alatau region.
The southernmost section of the frontier (i.e. roughly the southern half of the modern China–Tajikistan border) remained undemarcated, owing partly to the ongoing rivalry between Britain and Russia for dominance in Central Asia known as the Great Game; eventually the two agreed that Afghanistan would remain an independent buffer state between them, with Afghanistan's Wakhan Corridor being created in 1895. China was not a party to these agreements and hence the southernmost section of the China-Russia boundary remained undefined. When Tajikistan became independent in 1991 it inherited a section of the China-USSR frontier. That boundary followed the drainage basin divide between the Amu Darya and the Yarkand River until reaching Markansu.

In 2011, Tajikistan ratified a 1999 deal (and a 2002 supplementary agreement) to cede  respectively of land in the Pamir Mountains to the People's Republic of China, ending a 130-year dispute. The Republic of China had historically made similar claims in the area. Tajik attitudes toward the boundary treaty varied significantly among different interest groups, ranging from overt opposition to overt support.

In July 2020, repeated publication of an article by Cho Yao Lu in Chinese domestic media which suggested Tajikistan should give China more land was met with sharp disapproval in Tajikistan and Russia.

Geography
A point north of the Markansu River on the China–Tajikistan border is the westernmost point of China.

The border's southern terminus is found at the Afghanistan-China-Tajikistan tripoint on Povalo-Shveikovskogo Peak / Kokrash Kol Peak (Kekelaqukaole Peak) which is also the eastern end of the Afghanistan-Tajikistan border and the northern end of the Afghanistan-China border as well as the easternmost point of Afghanistan.

Border crossings
The Karasu Port of Entry at the Kulma Pass is the only modern day border crossing between China and Tajikistan. Historically, two passes further south along the border, Nezatash Pass and Beyik Pass, have also been traversed. Northwest of Kulma Pass is the Uzbel/Kyzyl-Dzhiik Pass (also known as Uzbel Shankou, Pereval Kyzyl-Dzhiik, Wuzibieli Pass, Kizil Jik Dawan, Kizöl-jiik Pass, K'o-tse-lo-chi-k'o Shan-k'ou, Qizil Jik Dāwan, Utzupieli Pass and Wu-tzu-pieh-li Shan-k'ou).

Historical maps
Historical English-language maps of the China-USSR (Tajik SSR) border area, mid to late 20th century, and historical maps including the pre-2011 China–Tajikistan border:

See also
 Chalachigu Valley
 List of extreme points of China
 Extreme points of Tajikistan
 Karakoram Highway
 Beyik Pass
 Tegermansu Pass 
 Wakhjir Pass 
 Kilik Pass 
 Mintaka Pass 
 Afghanistan–China border 
 China–Pakistan border

Notes

References 

 
border
Borders of China
Borders of Tajikistan
International borders